Enixotrophon ziczac is a species of sea snail, a marine gastropod mollusk in the family Muricidae, the murex snails or rock snails.

Description

Distribution
This marine species occurs off Japan.

References

 Tiba R. (1981) Descriptions of two new species of the genus Trophonopsis from the southern Japan (Gastropoda Muricacea). Bulletin of the Institute of Malacology, Tokyo 1(7): 105-106, pl. 34.
 Marshall B.A. & Houart R. (2011) The genus Pagodula (Mollusca: Gastropoda: Muricidae) in Australia, the New Zealand region and the Tasman Sea. New Zealand Journal of Geology and Geophysics 54(1): 89–114.

Gastropods described in 1981
Enixotrophon